The men's 3000 metres steeplechase event at the 1970 British Commonwealth Games was held on 22 and 25 July at the Meadowbank Stadium in Edinburgh, Scotland. It was the first time that the metric distance was contested at the Games replacing the mile.

Medalists

Results

Heats
Qualification: First 5 in each heat (Q) qualify directly for the final.

Final

References

Heats results (p9)
Australian results

Athletics at the 1970 British Commonwealth Games
1970